Georgi Knjazev (born May 22, 1971) is a Macedonian former professional basketball player who played for many clubs in Macedonia like MZT Skopje, Rabotnički, Kumanovo and many more. He was also member of Macedonia national basketball team. Since 2008 he has been a head coach in the Kuwait Division 1 League, with most of his success coming during his tenure as the head coach of Al Nasar Basketball Club. He is the son of Aleksandar Knjazev, a coach and former player.

External links

References

1971 births
Living people
KK MZT Skopje players
KK Rabotnički players
Macedonian men's basketball players
Shooting guards
Sportspeople from Skopje